Downtown Fargo District, or Downtown Fargo Historic District, is a historic district in Fargo, North Dakota that was listed on the National Register of Historic Places in 1983.

It includes Late 19th and 20th Century Revivals architecture, Moderne architecture, and Late Victorian architecture.

The district includes the following properties that were already separately listed on the NRHP:
 Grand Lodge of North Dakota, Ancient Order of United Workmen, 112-114 Roberts St.
deLendrecie's Department Store, 620-624 Main Avenue
Northern Pacific Railway Depot, 701 Main Avenue, designed by Cass Gilbert
Masonic Block, 9-11 Eighth Street South
Fargo Theatre, 312-316 Broadway

The Black Building (Fargo, North Dakota) is included in the district and also became separately listed on the National Register in 2016.

Significant buildings, structures, and objects include:
Rollo statue, recognizing Norse citizenry.

References

Geography of Cass County, North Dakota
Moderne architecture in North Dakota
Victorian architecture in North Dakota
Historic districts on the National Register of Historic Places in North Dakota
National Register of Historic Places in Cass County, North Dakota